NGC 5545 is a spiral galaxy in the northern constellation of Boötes. It is interacting with the barred spiral galaxy NGC 5544.

References

External links
 
 Distance
 Image NGC 5545
 http://seds.org/

NGC 05545
5545
09143
051023
199
Interacting galaxies
Unbarred spiral galaxies